Dr. Scott Bennett is Yale University Librarian Emeritus and a consultant to institutions and organizations related to the library and information science fields.  He has also published numerous articles on topics such as information access, digital preservation, library funding, bibliography, publishing and intellectual property, copyright, publishing history, textual editing, utilization of library space, and library education and training programs.

References

Living people
Year of birth missing (living people)
Yale University staff
American librarians